Aleksei Yuryevich Shiyanov (born 12 March 1973) is a Russian professional football official and a former player.

External links

1973 births
Footballers from Moscow
Living people
Soviet footballers
Russian footballers
Russia under-21 international footballers
Association football goalkeepers
FC Asmaral Moscow players
FC Dynamo Moscow reserves players
FC Tekstilshchik Kamyshin players
FC Fakel Voronezh players
FC Khimki players
FC Zimbru Chișinău players
FC Metallurg Lipetsk players
FC Spartak Tambov players
FC Lokomotiv Kaluga players
Russian Premier League players
Russian expatriate footballers
Expatriate footballers in Moldova
FC Sportakademklub Moscow players